Chess for the 2013 Asian Indoor and Martial Arts Games was held at the Yonsei Global University Campus. It took place from 30 June to 6 July 2013. This was the third time this sport was part of the Games, after Macau 2007 and Hanoi 2009.

Medalists

Medal table

Results

Men's individual standard
30 June – 3 July

Women's individual standard
30 June – 3 July

Mixed team blitz
6 July

Swiss round

Knockout round

Mixed team rapid

Swiss round
4–5 July

Knockout round
5 July

References

External links
 
 Chess Results

2013
Asian Indoor and Martial Arts Games
Asian Indoor and Martial Arts Games 2013
2013 Asian Indoor and Martial Arts Games events
Asian Indoor and Martial Arts Games 2013